Shek Kong is an area north of Tai Mo Shan, located near Kam Tin and Pat Heung, in Yuen Long District, New Territories, Hong Kong.

Shek Kong Airfield is located in Shek Kong. A sizable Nepal Gurkha population is present in the area even after the withdrawal of British military.

Climate
<div style="width:80%;">

</div style>

Education
Shek Kong is in Primary One Admission (POA) School Net 74. Within the school net are multiple aided schools (operated independently but funded with government money) and one government school: Yuen Long Government Primary School (元朗官立小學).

References

 
Places in Hong Kong
Yuen Long District
Nepalese diaspora in Hong Kong